TVP may stand for:

Arts and entertainment
 Television Personalities, an English post-punk band
 , an Argentine public broadcaster
 , a Polish public broadcaster
 , a former Malaysian educational channel
 TV Patrol, a Philippine primetime newscast

Medicine
 Transvenous pacing
 Tricuspid valve prolapse, a heart-valve misalignment

Science and technology
 True vapor pressure, a property of petroleum distillate
 TVPaint Animation, an animation software package

Other uses
 Textured vegetable protein, a soy-based food
 Thames Valley Police, a UK police force
 Tiverton Parkway railway station, UK (by station code)
 Total Valid Poll, in voting systems, used for the Droop quota